Seth C'deBaca (born April 28, 1988) is an American soccer player.

Career
C'deBaca scored the game-winner in his first professional start vs Dayton on April 21, 2012.

On September 8, 2012, C'deBaca appeared in an MLS Reserve League match for Seattle Sounders FC against Chivas USA as a guest player. He scored for the Sounders in the 90th minute off of a Mike Seamon cross.

References

External links
Georgetown Hoyas bio

1988 births
Living people
American soccer players
Georgetown Hoyas men's soccer players
Pittsburgh Riverhounds SC players
Soccer players from New Mexico
Association football midfielders